Coleophora occatella is a moth of the family Coleophoridae. It is found in Bulgaria, Romania, Ukraine and southern Russia.

Adults are on wing in May and August.

References

occatella
Moths described in 1880
Moths of Europe